Eburia brunneicomis is a species of beetle in the family Cerambycidae, that can be found in Belize, Guatemala and Mexico.

References

Beetles described in 1973
brunneicomis